Wilhelm Bohnstedt (5 October 1888 – 11 August 1947) was a German general in the Wehrmacht during World War II who commanded the 32nd Infantry Division. He was a recipient of the Knight's Cross of the Iron Cross of Nazi Germany. Bohnstedt surrendered in 1945 and was interned until 1947. He was the younger brother of Eberhardt Bohnstedt.

Awards and decorations

 Knight's Cross of the Iron Cross on 13 October 1941 as Generalmajor and commander of 32. Infanterie-Division

References

Citations

Bibliography

1888 births
1947 deaths
German Army personnel of World War I
German prisoners of war in World War II
Lieutenant generals of the German Army (Wehrmacht)
People from the Province of Pomerania
People from Sławno County
Prussian Army personnel
Recipients of the clasp to the Iron Cross, 1st class
Recipients of the Knight's Cross of the Iron Cross
German Army officers of World War II